The Publishers Association (PA) is the trade organisation serving book, journal and electronic publishers in the United Kingdom, established in 1896. Its mission is to strengthen the trading environment for UK publishers by providing a strong voice for the industry in government, in society and with other stakeholders in the UK, Europe and internationally. It seeks to provide a forum for the exchange of non‑competitive information between publishers and offer support and guidance to the industry through technological and other changes.

Governance
The Publishers Association’s board, known as the PA Council, consists of representatives elected from the membership, together with the chairs of the Consumer Publishers Council, the Academic Publishing Council, the Educational Publishers Council and the Higher and Further Education Publishers Council; and the chief executive. It meets approximately six times a year. A member of Council may serve up to two three-year terms. The current President of the Publishers Association is Nigel Newton, Chief Executive of Bloomsbury. 

The senior management team includes

Dan Conway, CEO
Louis Coiffait-Gunn, Director of Policy and Public Affairs
Ruth Howells, Director of Communications
Catriona Stevenson, General Counsel
Mark Wharton, Director of Operations

Membership
Membership of the Publishers Association is open to bona fide publishers that carry on the business of publishing in the UK and satisfy the membership criteria. There are two categories of membership:
 Membership for UK publishers with a turnover greater than £2.5 million
 SME membership for UK publishers with a turnover of less than £2.5 million

Divisions
 The Consumer Publishers Council determines PA policy on consumer market matters, and acts on specific issues with the aim of expanding the market and increasing efficiency. Other trade groups include the Children’s Book Group and Religious Book Group.
 The Academic Publishers Council provides a forum for higher education, scholarly and reference publishers, representing publishers, conducting market research and running a number of events.
 The Educational Publishers Council provides a voice for school, college and vocational publishers. It campaigns for better funding for learning resources and represents the industry in the development of the market, as well as running seminars and compiling market statistics.

See also
International Publishers Association
International Intellectual Property Alliance

References

Further reading 
The Publishers Association 1896 - 1946 by R. J. L. Kingsford (Cambridge: Cambridge University Press, 1970)

External links
The Publishers Association website
Copyright Infringement Portal

Trade associations based in the United Kingdom
Media and communications in the London Borough of Southwark
Organisations based in the London Borough of Southwark
Organizations established in 1896
Publishing-related professional associations
1896 establishments in the United Kingdom
Publishing in the United Kingdom